Slayers Bay Blues is the third album of Japanese band Electric Eel Shock and was released in 1999.

In 1999, Electric Eel Shock (EES) recorded Slayers Bay Blues on a multitrack recording, and pressed enough copies to take to the road for their first gigs abroad. They had lined up a handful of dates in and around New York City, including CBGB, with their friends Peelander-Z who had relocated there some time earlier. The gigs were a big success, and the handful of dates that were planned turned into an East Coast tour.

Track listings 
This track listing corresponds to the Micro Music, Double Peace Recording release of Slayer's Bay Blues.

All tracks written by Electric Eel Shock

Release history

More about release 
EES left their native Japan in 1999 to see what they could make of America and they have been on a near constant world tour ever since. EES paid their way by selling merchandise and their self recorded album Slayers Bay Blues at their gigs. Headlining a stage at the Roskilde Festival in Denmark was a key early event for the band. By 2004 EES had toured 27 countries around the world.

References 

Electric Eel Shock albums